Dextrorphan (DXO) is a psychoactive drug of the morphinan class which acts as an antitussive or cough suppressant and dissociative hallucinogen. It is the dextrorotatory enantiomer of racemorphan; the levorotatory enantiomer is levorphanol. Dextrorphan is produced by O-demethylation of dextromethorphan by CYP2D6. Dextrorphan is an NMDA antagonist and contributes to the psychoactive effects of dextromethorphan.

Pharmacology

Pharmacodynamics

The pharmacology of dextrorphan is similar to that of dextromethorphan (DXM). However, dextrorphan is much more potent as an NMDA receptor antagonist as well much less active as a serotonin reuptake inhibitor, but retains DXM's activity as a norepinephrine reuptake inhibitor.
It also has more affinity for the opioid receptors than dextromethorphan, significantly so at high doses.

Pharmacokinetics
Dextrorphan has a notably longer elimination half-life than its parent compound, and therefore has a tendency to accumulate in the blood after repeated administration of normally dosed dextromethorphan formulations. It is further converted to 3-HM by CYP3A4 or glucuronidated.

Society and culture

Legal status
Dextrorphan was formerly a Schedule I controlled substance in the United States, but was unscheduled on October 1, 1976.

Research
Dextrorphan was under development for the treatment of stroke, and reached phase II clinical trials for this indication, but development was discontinued.

Environmental presence
In 2021, dextrorphan was identified in >75% of sludge samples taken from 12 wastewater treatment plants in California. The same study associated dextrorphan with estrogenic activity by using predictive modelling, before observing it in in vitro.

See also 
 Cough syrup
 Racemorphan; Levorphanol
 Noscapine
 Codeine; Pholcodine
 Dextromethorphan; Dimemorfan
 Butamirate
 Pentoxyverine
 Tipepidine
 Cloperastine
 Levocloperastine

References

Antitussives
Dissociative drugs
Enantiopure drugs
Euphoriants
Morphinans
Mu-opioid receptor agonists
Nicotinic antagonists
NMDA receptor antagonists
Phenols
Serotonin–norepinephrine reuptake inhibitors
Sigma agonists